Tarvas may refer to:

BC Rakvere Tarvas, basketball club based in Rakvere
Rakvere JK Tarvas, football club based in Rakvere

People with the surname
Karl Tarvas (1885–1975), Estonian architect
Peeter Tarvas (1916–1987), Estonian architect and professor

See also
Tarva (disambiguation), name of several places, in Estonian the genitive of Tarvas
Taurus (disambiguation)

Estonian-language surnames